Linear acetylenic carbon (LAC), also known as carbyne or Linear Carbon Chain (LCC), is an allotrope of carbon that has the chemical structure  as a repeat unit, with alternating single and triple bonds. It would thus be the ultimate member of the polyyne family.

This polymeric carbyne is of considerable interest to nanotechnology as its Young's modulus is  – forty times that of diamond; this extraordinary number is, however, based on a novel definition of cross-sectional area that does not correspond to the space occupied by the structure. Carbyne has also been identified in interstellar space; however, its existence in condensed phases has been contested recently, as such chains would crosslink exothermically (and perhaps explosively) if they approached each other.

History and controversy
The first claims of detection of this allotrope were made in 1960 and repeated in 1978. A 1982 re-examination of samples from several previous reports determined that the signals originally attributed to carbyne were in fact due to silicate impurities in the samples. Absence of carbyne crystalline rendered the direct observation of a pure carbyne-assembled solid still a major challenge, because carbyne crystals with well-defined structures and sufficient sizes are not available to date. This is indeed the major obstacle to general acceptance of carbyne as a true carbon allotrope. The mysterious carbyne still attracted scientists with its possible extraordinary properties.

During the past thirty five years an increasing body of experimental and theoretical work has been published in the scientific literature dealing with the preparation of carbyne and the study of its structure, properties and potential applications.
In 1968 a silver-white new mineral was discovered in graphitic gneisses of the Ries Crater (Nordlingen, Bavaria, Germany). This material was found to consist entirely of carbon and its hexagonal cell dimensions matched those reported earlier for carbine by Russians scientists. It was concluded that this novel form of natural carbon, chaoite, was generated from graphite by the combined action of high temperature and high pressure, presumably caused by the impact of meteorite.  Soon afterwards this “white” carbon was synthesized by sublimation of pyrolytic graphite in vacuum.

In 1984, a group at Exxon reported the detection of clusters with even numbers of carbons, between 30 and 180, in carbon evaporation experiments, and attributed them to polyyne carbon. However, these clusters later were identified as fullerenes.

In 1991, carbyne was allegedly detected among various other allotropes of carbon in samples of amorphous carbon black vaporized and quenched by shock waves produced by shaped explosive charges.

In 1995, the preparation of carbyne chains with over 300 carbons was reported.  They were claimed to be reasonably stable, even against moisture and oxygen, as long as the terminal alkynes on the chain are capped with inert groups (such as tert-butyl or trifluoromethyl) rather than hydrogen atoms. The study claimed that the data specifically indicated a carbyne-like structures rather than fullerene-like ones.  However, according to H. Kroto, the properties and synthetic methods used in those studies are consistent with generation of fullerenes.

The assumed reaction was 
 ,
where M is either lithium, sodium, or potassium.  The authors conjectured that nanocrystals of the metal fluoride between the chains prevented their polymerization.

In 1999, it was reported that copper(I) acetylide, after partial oxidation by exposure to air or copper(II) ions followed by decomposition with hydrochloric acid, leaves a "carbonaceous" residue with the spectral signature of  chains with n=2–6.  The proposed mechanism involves oxidative polymerization of the acetylide anions  into carbyne-type anions  or cumulene-type anions .  Also, thermal decomposition of copper acetylide in vacuum yielded a fluffy deposit of fine carbon powder on the walls of the flask, which, on the basis of spectral data, was claimed to be carbyne rather than graphite.  Finally, the oxidation of copper acetylide in ammoniacal solution (Glaser's reaction) produces a carbonaceous residue that was claimed to consist of "polyacetylide" anions capped with residual copper(I) ions,
  .
On the basis of the residual amount of copper, the mean number of units n was estimated to be around 230.

In 2004, an analysis of a synthesized linear carbon allotrope found it to have a cumulene electronic structure—sequential double bonds along an sp-hybridized carbon chain—rather than the alternating triple–single pattern of linear carbyne.

In 2016, the synthesis of linear chains of up to 6,000 sp-hybridized carbon atoms was reported. The chains were grown inside double-walled carbon nanotubes, and are highly stable protected by their hosts.

Polyynes
While the existence of "carbyne" chains in pure neutral carbon material is still disputed, short  chains are well established as substructures of larger molecules (polyynes).  As of 2010, the longest such chain in a stable molecule had 22 acetylenic units (44 atoms), stabilized by rather bulky end groups.

Structure
The carbon atoms in this form are each linear in geometry with sp orbital hybridisation.

Other possible configurations for a chain of carbon atoms include polycumulene (polyethylene-diylidene) chains with double bonds only. For short  molecules, however, the polycumulene structure seems favored. When n is even, two ground configurations, very close in energy, may coexist: one linear, and one cyclic (rhombic).

Properties
Carbyne chains have been claimed to be the strongest material known per density. Calculations indicate that carbyne's specific tensile strength (strength divided by density) of  beats graphene, carbon nanotubes, and diamond.

Outfitted with molecular handles at chain's ends, it can also be twisted to alter its band gap. With a  end-to-end twist, carbyne turns into a magnetic semiconductor.

This lower bound is the smallest band gap of linear carbon chains observed so far. The comparison with experimental data obtained for short chains in gas phase or in solution demonstrates the effect of the DWCNT encapsulation, leading to an essential downshift of the band gap.

The LCCs inside double-walled carbon nanotubes lead to an increase of the photoluminescence (PL) signal of the inner tubes up to a factor of 6 for tubes with (8,3) chirality. This behavior can be attributed to a local charge transfer from the inner tubes to the carbon chains, counterbalancing quenching mechanisms induced by the outer tubes.

Carbyne chains can take on side molecules that may make the chains suitable for energy and hydrogen storage.

With a differential Raman scattering cross section of 10−22 cm 2 sr−1 per atom, carbyne chains confined inside carbon nanotubes are the strongest Raman scatterer ever reported, exceeding any other know material by two orders of magnitude.

References

Further reading 

Nanotechnology
Allotropes of carbon
Alkynes